Laine Peters [pronounced: LAY-nee] (born March 24, 1970 in Arborfield, Saskatchewan)  is a Canadian curler, from Calgary. Peters has played in 11 Tournament of Hearts and six World Championships. She is currently the coach of the Tabitha Peterson rink from the United States.

Peters grew up in Carrot River, Saskatchewan.

Career

Nova Scotia
At the 1999 Scott Tournament of Hearts, Peters was the alternate with Nova Scotia (skipped by Colleen Jones). The team won the event, and represented Canada at the 1999 Ford World Women's Curling Championship, where they finished fifth. Peters would not play in any games in either event.

Peters won her first Nova Scotia Tournament of Hearts in 2000, playing lead with Team Kay Zinck. The team would represent Nova Scotia at the 2000 Scott Tournament of Hearts. After posting a 7-4 round robin record, the team lost in a tiebreaker to Team British Columbia, skipped by Kelley Law.

Peters was the alternate with Team Nova Scotia again (skipped by Jones) at the 2001 Scott Tournament of Hearts, which the team won. They would go on to win a gold medal at the 2001 Ford World Women's Curling Championship. Again, Peters would not play in any games with the team. Peters would continue to be the alternate with the team at the 2002 and 2003 Scott Tournament of Hearts, winning both events. The team would finish in fourth place at the 2002 Ford World Women's Curling Championship and won a silver medal at the 2003 Ford World Women's Curling Championship. Peters would play in two games at the 2003 Hearts.

Peters won her second Nova Scotia provincial title in 2004, playing second with Team Heather Smith-Dacey. The team represented Nova Scotia at the 2004 Scott Tournament of Hearts, finishing the round robin with a 6-5 record, missing the playoffs.

Peters won a third Nova Scotia title in 2008, playing second with Team Mary-Anne Arsenault. The team represented Nova Scotia at the 2008 Scotties Tournament of Hearts, and again finished the round robin with a 6-5 record, missing the playoffs.

In addition to her women's success, Peters won the Canadian Mixed Curling Championship in 2002 playing lead with a team skipped by Mark Dacey.

Alberta
Peters moved to Calgary in 2009 and joined Team Heather Nedohin in 2010 as her lead. Peters won her first Alberta Scotties Tournament of Hearts in 2012. The team would represent Alberta at the 2012 Scotties Tournament of Hearts. There, Peters and teammate Beth Iskiw became the first time teammates had played together for two different provinces (the pair represented Nova Scotia at the 2004 Hearts). Finishing the round robin with a 7-4 record, the team won all three of their playoff games en route to the championship. The team represented Canada at the 2012 Ford World Women's Curling Championship. At the Worlds, they finished the round robin with a 7-4 record, tied with the United States (skipped by Allison Pottinger). They beat the Americans, but would lose to South Korea (skipped by Kim Ji-sun) in the 3 vs. 4 page playoff game, sending Canada to the bronze medal game. The bronze medal game would be a re-match against the Koreans, with Canada prevailing.

The Nedohin rink would represent Team Canada at the 2013 Scotties Tournament of Hearts by virtue of winning the championship the year prior. The team finished the round robin with a 7-4 record, sending the team to the playoffs. There, the team beat British Columbia (skipped by Kelly Scott) in the 3 vs. 4 game, but lost in the semifinal against Manitoba (skipped by Jennifer Jones). That sent the team to a bronze medal rematch against B.C., which they would lose.

Nedohin retired from competitive curling in 2015, and the team replaced her with Chelsea Carey as the team's skip. The team won another Alberta Scotties in 2016, and would represent Alberta at the 2016 Scotties Tournament of Hearts. There, the team finished the round robin in first place with a 9-2 record. They would go on to win both of their playoff games, defeating Team Canada (skipped by Jennifer Jones) in the 1 vs. 2 game and Northern Ontario (skipped by Krista McCarville) in the final en route to the championship. The team represented Canada at the 2016 Ford World Women's Curling Championship, where they finished the round robin with an 8-3 record. In the playoffs, they would lose to Russia (skipped by Anna Sidorova) twice, settling for a fourth-place finish.

Team Carey would represent Team Canada at the 2017 Scotties Tournament of Hearts as defending champions. They finished the event with a 9-2 record, sending the team to the playoffs. There, they would lose to Northern Ontario's Krista McCarville in the 3 vs. 4 game, before beating them in the bronze medal game.

Team Carey played in the 2017 Canadian Olympic Curling Trials, and after going undefeated in the round robin, they would lose to Team Rachel Homan in the final.

For the 2018-19 season, Peters joined a new team of Laura Walker, Cathy Overton-Clapham and Lori Olson-Johns. They played in four of seven Slams. At provincials, they were knocked out of the C Event 9-2 by Jodi Marthaller. After just one season, the team disbanded.

Honours
Peters has been inducted into the Nova Scotia Sports Hall of Fame and recently CurlSask created an award in her name to honour junior campers best demonstrating teamwork, sportsmanship, community involvement, and leadership skills.

Personal life
Peters is employed as an executive assistant, at Bird Construction.

Teams

References

External links

Curlers from Nova Scotia
Living people
1970 births
Canadian women curlers
World curling champions
Canadian women's curling champions
Canadian mixed curling champions
Curlers from Calgary
Continental Cup of Curling participants
Canada Cup (curling) participants
Canadian curling coaches